Turbonilla hoeki is a species of sea snail, a marine gastropod mollusk in the family Pyramidellidae, the pyrams and their allies.

The species name Turbonilla hoecki is a misspelling.

Description
The shell grows to a length of 7.5 mm

Distribution
This species occurs in the following locations:
 European waters (ERMS scope) : France
 Atlantic Ocean : the Azores

Notes
Additional information regarding this species:
 Habitat: Known from seamounts and knolls

References

 Peñas A. & Rolán E., 1999. Pyramidellidae (Gastropoda, Heterostropha) de la misión oceanográfica "Seamount 2". Iberus suplemento 5: 151-199. page(s): 182-183

External links
 To CLEMAM
 To Encyclopedia of Life
 To World Register of Marine Species
 CLEMAM: Turbonilla hoeki

hoeki
Gastropods described in 1896